Mokowanis Lake is in Glacier National Park in the U. S. state of Montana,  north of Margaret Lake and just northeast of Pyramid Peak.

See also
List of lakes in Glacier County, Montana

References

Lakes of Glacier National Park (U.S.)
Lakes of Glacier County, Montana